The 2012 Radivoj Korać Cup was the 10th season of the Serbian national basketball cup tournament. The Žućko's left trophy awarded to the winner Partizan from Belgrade.

Venue

Qualified teams

A League table position after 13 rounds played

Bracket

Quarterfinals

Semifinals

Final

See also
 2011–12 ABA League
 2011–12 Basketball League of Serbia
 2011–12 Basketball Cup of Serbia
 2011–12 KK Crvena zvezda season
 2011–12 KK Partizan season

References

External links
 Competitions in Basketball Federation of Serbia 

Radivoj Korać Cup
Radivoj
Serbia